Escape in the Dark or Flight into Darkness is a 1939 German crime film directed by Arthur Maria Rabenalt and starring Hertha Feiler, Joachim Gottschalk and Ernst von Klipstein.

It was made at the Babelsberg Studios outside Berlin. The film's sets were designed by the art director Willi Herrmann.

The film is about two veterans of the First World War employed in a chemistry works laboratory.

Cast

References

Bibliography

External links

1939 crime films
German crime films
Films of Nazi Germany
Films directed by Arthur Maria Rabenalt
German black-and-white films
Terra Film films
Films shot at Babelsberg Studios
1930s German films
1930s German-language films